Tropidophorus noggei, Nogge's water skink, is a species of skink found in Vietnam.

References

noggei
Reptiles of Vietnam
Reptiles described in 2005
Taxa named by Thomas Ziegler (zoologist)